The KMSP Tower is a high aerial guyed mast used for the transmission of FM radio and over-the-air television in Shoreview, Minnesota. The structure was apparently the tallest in Minnesota until the construction of the KPXM Tower in 1997.

The tower, which was built in 1971, is owned by KMSP ("Fox 9") parent Fox Television Stations but is shared by several area broadcasters; sister station WFTC ("Fox 9+") and the Twin Cities Public Television stations, KTCA and KTCI.  Several FM stations are also on the tower: KQRS-FM 92.5 ("KQ92"), KXXR 93.7 ("93X"), KTCZ 97.1 ("Cities 97"), KTIS-FM 98.5, KSJN 99.5 ("MPR Classical"), KFXN 100.3 ("KFAN"), KDWB 101.3, KEEY 102.1 ("K102"), KMNB 102.9 ("102.9 The Wolf"), and KZJK 104.1 ("Jack FM").

In 2001, a painter working on the tower died from asphyxia upon falling 500 feet down the structure.

FM

Television

See also
Telefarm Towers — another major broadcasting installation nearby
List of masts

References

External links
 

Towers in Minnesota
Radio masts and towers in the United States
Towers completed in 1971
1971 establishments in Minnesota
Buildings and structures in Ramsey County, Minnesota